Feth Nour Aliouat (born 25 April 1987) is an Algerian footballer who plays for MO Béjaïa in the Algerian Ligue 2 as a forward.

Career statistics

Club

References

External links

1995 births
Living people
Association football defenders
Algerian footballers
Algerian Ligue Professionnelle 1 players
USM Blida players
People from Blida
21st-century Algerian people